Shannon Pohl  (born 9 November 1980) is a badminton player from the United States.

Career
Shannon was the highest-ranked American badminton player in the world in women’s singles in 2009. Her top ranking is #69 in the world in women’s singles. Shannon was a member of the United States World Championship Badminton Team in 2005, 2006, 2007 and 2009. She has represented the United States in badminton tournaments in 46 countries.

She played at the 2005 World Badminton Championships in Anaheim and reached the round of 32.

Coaching
Shannon is currently head coach and director of the Shannon Pohl Badminton Academy in Vernon Hills, IL.  She is a USA Badminton Level 2 Elite Talent Coach and she was the US Assistant National Coach for the 2010 Jr. Pan American Championships.

External links
Shannon Pohl - official site

References

American female badminton players
1980 births
Living people
Maccabiah Games gold medalists for the United States
Maccabiah Games silver medalists for the United States
Competitors at the 2013 Maccabiah Games
Maccabiah Games medalists in badminton
21st-century American Jews
21st-century American women